Rhododendron subansiriense is a species of flowering plant in the family Ericaceae, endemic to the Subansiri district of northeastern India.

It is rarely found in cultivation in temperate zones, as it is susceptible to late frosts.

Footnotes

References

subansiriense
Flora of Arunachal Pradesh
Vulnerable plants
Taxonomy articles created by Polbot